Berens River is located in Manitoba, Canada, along the eastern shore of Lake Winnipeg.  This community is near the mouth of the Berens River, which flows west from the Ontario headwaters.

Prior to 2017, the community was accessible only by winter road, boat, or airplane. In 2010, a project to construct an all-weather road from Bloodvein, connecting Berens River to the provincial road system, was announced. Road construction was completed in December 2017, linking the two communities to Provincial Road 304.

The First Nation and fur trade community there was officially started in the 19th century, but the spot was a traditional hunting and fishing area for thousands of years. 
The two communities create a population centre also called Berens River. Both are served by the Berens River Airport.

Demographics 

According to the 2011 Canada Census, the bordering Berens River 13 reserve of the Berens River First Nation had a population of 1,028.

Climate

Berens River experiences a humid continental climate (Dfb).

References 

Designated places in Manitoba
Northern communities in Manitoba